The Mexican cascades frog or white-striped frog (Lithobates pustulosus) is a species of frog in the family Ranidae endemic to Mexico, where it is known as rana de cascada.

Mexican cascades frog is a very common species inhabiting rocky cascading streams in tropical dry forest, possibly also coniferous forest at low to moderate elevations.

References

Lithobates
Endemic amphibians of Mexico
Fauna of the Sierra Madre Occidental
Taxonomy articles created by Polbot
Amphibians described in 1833
Sinaloan dry forests
Jalisco dry forests